Nageshwar Rao is an Indian professor who is serving as Vice Chancellor of Indira Gandhi National Open University, largest university in the world  and Director of Central Hindi Directorate and served as Director of Indian Institute of Advanced Study, Vice Chancellor of Uttarakhand Open University and Uttar Pradesh Rajarshi Tandon Open University and Honorary Fellow of Commonwealth of Learning.

References 

Indian academics
Indian directors